Eurytides dolicaon, the dolicaon kite swallowtail, is a butterfly of the family Papilionidae.

Description
The basic colour of the wings is creamy white with black veins. The hindwings have very long and thin tails, generally dark brown or black with yellow tips. The edges of the uppersides of the wings are dark brown or black. The undersides of the hindwings have brown bands forming large creamy white areas. On the margins of the hindwings there are a series of blue lunules.

Larvae feed on Guatteria species, Ocotea species and Nectandra membranacea.

Distribution
Eurytides dolicaon can be found in Central and South America (Guyana, south-eastern Brazil, Paraguay, Peru, eastern Colombia, eastern Ecuador, and north-western Venezuela).

Habitat

Subspecies
 Eurytides dolicaon dolicaon (Guyana)
 Eurytides dolicaon deicoon (C. Felder & R. Felder, 1864) (south-eastern Brazil, Paraguay)
 Eurytides dolicaon deileon (C. Felder & R. Felder, 1865) (eastern Colombia, eastern Ecuador)
 Eurytides dolicaon tromes (Rothschild & Jordan, 1906) (north-western Venezuela)
 Eurytides dolicaon septentrionalis Brown, 1994 (Panama)
 Eurytides dolicaon hebreus Brown & Lamas, 1994 (Colombia)
 Eurytides dolicaon cauraensis Möhn, 2002 (south-eastern Venezuela)

References
 
 "Eurytides dolicaon Cramer, 1775". Insecta.pro. Retrieved February 5, 2020.
 Learn About Butterflies

Lewis, H. L., 1974 Butterflies of the World  Page 23, figure 13.
Edwin Möhn, 2002 Schmetterlinge der Erde, Butterflies of the world Part XIIII (14), Papilionidae VIII: Baronia, Euryades, Protographium, Neographium, Eurytides. Edited by Erich Bauer and Thomas Frankenbach Keltern: Goecke & Evers; Canterbury: Hillside Books.  All species and subspecies are included, also most of the forms. Several females are shown the first time in colour.

Eurytides
Papilionidae of South America
Butterflies described in 1776